Florian Schulz is a German nature and wildlife photographer.

Photographic career
Florian Schulz is the youngest founding member of the  International League of Conservation Photographers (ILCP) which empowers conservation-minded photographers to use their talents to help create an understanding for the natural world.

Articles
Articles and images have been published by magazines including the BBC Wildlife Mag (Britain), Nature’s Best, Outdoor Photographer, PhotoMedia, National Parks Magazine, The Nature Conservancy, The New York Times (USA), and Natur & Kosmos (Ger), as well as in numerous international book publications like Transboundary Conservation and the Human Footprint (Mex).

Bibliography
Yellowstone to Yukon: Freedom to Roam (Braided River, 2005)
To The Arctic (Braided River, 2007)
Journey to the Arctic (Braided River, 2008)
The Wild Edge: Freedom to Roam the Pacific Coast (Braided River, 2015)

References

External links
Official website

1975 births
Living people
People from Weingarten, Württemberg
21st-century German photographers
Nature photographers
Sierra Club awardees